Oluwafemi Gege Soriola (born 21 November 1988) is a Nigerian international footballer who plays for Saudi club Riffa SC as a centre back.

Club career
Born in Lagos, Soriola has played club football for JUTH, Hakoah Amidar Ramat Gan, Bayelsa United, Heartland, Free State Stars, Montreal Impact, Shooting Stars and Malkiya.

On 19 June 2018, he joined Prince Mohammad bin Salman League club Hajer Club. He left the club at the end of the season and signed with Riffa SC from Bahrain in August 2019.

International career
He made his international debut for Nigeria in 2012.

References

External links

1988 births
Living people
Nigerian footballers
Nigeria international footballers
JUTH F.C. players
Hakoah Maccabi Amidar Ramat Gan F.C. players
Bayelsa United F.C. players
Heartland F.C. players
Free State Stars F.C. players
CF Montréal players
Shooting Stars S.C. players
Malkiya Club players
Riffa SC players
South African Premier Division players
Bahraini Premier League players
Association football defenders
Nigerian expatriate footballers
Nigerian expatriate sportspeople in South Africa
Expatriate soccer players in South Africa
Nigerian expatriate sportspeople in Canada
Expatriate soccer players in Canada
Nigerian expatriate sportspeople in Bahrain
Expatriate footballers in Bahrain
Nigerian expatriate sportspeople in Saudi Arabia
Expatriate footballers in Saudi Arabia
Saudi First Division League players
Hajer FC players